In Greek mythology, Iodame or Iodama (Ancient Greek:  or  probably means 'heifer calf of Io') was a Thessalian princess as the daughter of King Itonus of Iton in Phthiotis. She was the granddaughter of Amphictyon.

Family 
Iodame was the mother of Thebe by Zeus while some authors, adds another son, Deucalion.

Mythology 
Iodame was a priestess at the temple of Athena Itonia built by her father. When she trespassed the precinct one night, Athena appeared in front of her; at the sight of Medusa's head which was worked in the goddess' garment, Iodame turned into a block of stone. After this, a priestess lit the fire on the altar every day, repeating thrice: "Iodame lives and demands fire".

An alternate story of Athena and Iodame is found in the Etymologicum Magnum. According to it, both Iodame and Athena were daughters of Itonus. They became jealous of each other and started fighting, which resulted in Iodame being killed by Athena. The story is similar to that of Athena and Pallas (daughter of Triton).

Interpretation 
Robert Graves interpreted the myth of Iodama in the following passage:"Iodama, probably meaning ‘heifer calf of Io’, will have been an antique stone image of the Moon-goddess, and the story of her petrification is a warning to inquisitive girls against violating the Mysteries."

Notes

References 

 Graves, Robert, The Greek Myths: The Complete and Definitive Edition. Penguin Books Limited. 2017. 
 Pausanias, Description of Greece with an English Translation by W.H.S. Jones, Litt.D., and H.A. Ormerod, M.A., in 4 Volumes. Cambridge, MA, Harvard University Press; London, William Heinemann Ltd. 1918. . Online version at the Perseus Digital Library
 Pausanias, Graeciae Descriptio. 3 vols. Leipzig, Teubner. 1903.  Greek text available at the Perseus Digital Library.

Greek mythological priestesses
Mortal women of Zeus
Deeds of Athena
Metamorphoses into inanimate objects in Greek mythology